Seven Stories into '98 is an IQ album, released in 1998 as a new version of the demo album Seven Stories into Eight (1982).

Track listing

1998 version 
Disc 1
 “Capital Letters (In Surgical Spirit Land)” – 3:49
 “About Lake Five” – 5:26
 “Intelligence Quotient” – 8:18
 “For Christ’s Sake” – 5:17
 “Barbell Is In” – 4:53
 “Fascination” – 7:03
 “For The Taking” – 4:33
 “It All Stops Here” – 7:53
 “Eloko Bella Neechi” – 5:16

1982 version 
Disc 2
 “Capital Letters (In Surgical Spirit Land)” – 3:46
 “About Lake Five” – 5:01
 “Intelligence Quotient” – 6:55
 “For Christ’s Sake” – 5:05
 “Barbell Is In” – 5:31
 “Fascination” – 5:56
 “For The Taking” – 4:17
 “It All Stops Here” – 6:57

References

External links
 http://www.discogs.com/IQ-Seven-Stories-Into-Eight/master/858173

IQ (band) albums
1998 albums